The Serbian Embassy in Budapest is Serbia's diplomatic mission to Hungary. It is located at 1068, Dózsa György út 92/b, Budapest, Hungary. 

The current Serbian ambassador to Hungary is Barbara Avdalović.

History 
The building used to be a seat of Yugoslavian Embassy and later Embassy of Serbia and Montenegro.

In 1956, Prime Minister Imre Nagy asked for asylum and secured sanctuary in the embassy after the anti-Soviet revolution was crushed. However he was later arrested, deported to Romania and executed in 1958. The embassy overlooks Andrássy Avenue and Heroes' Square, where the 1989 memorial service for the reburial of Nagy and others took place in front of a crowd of 250,000 people.

In 2002 Goran Svilanović, former Minister of Foreign Affairs of Serbia and Montenegro, proposed opening of Consulate in Szeged but this was never realised.

During the ceremony marking the 50th anniversary of the anti-Soviet uprising in 1956 in October 2006, the President of Serbia, Boris Tadić, and the Prime Minister of Hungary Ferenc Gyurcsány, revealed a commemorative plaque placed at the entrance, dedicated to Imre Nagy.

Gallery

See also
Hungary–Serbia relations
List of Ambassadors from Serbia
Foreign relations of Serbia

External links 

 Serbian Embassy in Budapest 

Budapest
Serbia
Hungary–Serbia relations